Walter James Little (10 November 1897 – 15 August 1976) was an English professional footballer who made 309 appearances in the Football League playing as a left back or left half for Brighton & Hove Albion and Clapton Orient.

Life and career
Little was born in Southall, Middlesex. He signed for Brighton & Hove Albion, then a Southern League club, in September 1919 after his demobilisation from the Army. He established himself as a first-team regular in the 1922–23 season, by which time Albion were playing in the Football League Third Division South, after switching from left back to left half, and by the time he left the club in 1929 had made 332 appearances in first-team competition. He scored 36 goals, most of which were penalties. He finished his career with a season at another Southern Section club, Clapton Orient. Little died in Exeter, Devon, in 1976 at the age of 78.

References

1897 births
1976 deaths
People from Southall
English footballers
Association football fullbacks
Association football wing halves
Brighton & Hove Albion F.C. players
Leyton Orient F.C. players
Southern Football League players
English Football League players
English football managers